Ah-mu Tuimalealiifano (born 30 May 1996) is a Samoan-born, Australian rugby union player who played for the  in the Super Rugby competition.  His position of choice is wing.

References 

Australian rugby union players
1996 births
Living people
Rugby union wings
Melbourne Rising players
Melbourne Rebels players